Nikodem Janusz Popławski (born March 1, 1975) is a Polish theoretical physicist, most widely noted for the hypothesis that every black hole could be a doorway to another universe and that the universe was formed within a black hole which itself exists in a larger universe. This hypothesis was listed by National Geographic and Science magazines among their top ten discoveries of 2010.

Black holes as doorways 
Popławski's approach is based on the Einstein–Cartan theory of gravity which extends general relativity to matter with intrinsic angular momentum (spin).  Spin in curved spacetime requires that the affine connection cannot be constrained to zero and its antisymmetric part, the torsion tensor, must be a variable in Hamilton's principle of stationary action which gives the field equations.  Torsion gives the correct generalization of the conservation law for the total (orbital plus intrinsic) angular momentum to the presence of the gravitational field, but also modifies the Dirac equation for fermions.

Gravitational effects of torsion on fermionic matter are significant at extremely high densities which exist inside black holes and at the beginning of the Universe.  Popławski theorizes that torsion manifests itself as a repulsive force which causes fermions to be spatially extended and prevents the formation of a gravitational singularity within the black hole's event horizon.  Because of torsion, the collapsing matter on the other side of the horizon reaches an enormous but finite density, explodes and rebounds, forming an Einstein-Rosen bridge (wormhole) to a new, closed, expanding universe.  Quantum particle production in strong gravitational fields helps torsion to overcome shear.  Analogously, the Big Bang is replaced by the Big Bounce before which the Universe was the interior of a black hole.  This scenario generates cosmic inflation, which explains why the present Universe at largest scales appears spatially flat, homogeneous and isotropic.  It may explain the arrow of time, solve the black hole information paradox, and explain the nature of dark matter.  Torsion may also be responsible for the observed asymmetry between matter and antimatter in the Universe. The rotation of a black hole could influence the spacetime on the other side of its event horizon and result in a preferred direction in the new universe.  Popławski suggests that the observed fluctuations in the cosmic microwave background might provide evidence for his hypothesis.

Popławski also proposed that the momentum components do not commute in the presence of torsion.  Accordingly, integration over the continuous momentum in Feynman diagrams is replaced with summation over the discrete momentum eigenvalues whose separation increases with magnitude.  Consequently, divergent integrals in Feynman diagrams are replaced with convergent sums.  Therefore, torsion might eliminate ultraviolet divergence and provide a physical mechanism for regularization in quantum field theory, giving finite values of bare quantities such as the mass and electric charge of the electron.

Education 
Popławski received his M.S. degree in astronomy from the University of Warsaw (1999), and his Ph.D. degree in physics from Indiana University (2004), where he later worked as a lecturer and researcher in theoretical physics.  He joined the Department of Mathematics and Physics at the University of New Haven as a senior lecturer in 2013 and became a distinguished lecturer in 2020.

In popular culture
Popławski appeared in an episode of the TV show Through the Wormhole titled "Are There Parallel Universes?" (season 2) and in an episode of the Discovery Channel show Curiosity titled "Is There a Parallel Universe?", which aired in 2011.

See also 
 Cosmological natural selection

References

External links 
 Academic website

1975 births
Cosmologists
Living people
21st-century Polish physicists
Theoretical physicists